Rodolphe Collinet is a Belgian businessman. He is President Director of Executive Board, Chief Executive Officer, President, Chief Executive Officer of Carmeuse Group and President of Carmeuse Group. He succeeded his father, Dominique Collinet, as CEO of Carmeuse in 2003.

Biography 
Rodolpe Collinet is the great-great-grand son of the founder of Carmeuse.

Rodolphe Collinet obtained a master's degree from the University of Namur, and an MBA from the University of Chicago.

In 2012, he signed a $140-million contract to build a limestone-processing plant in Oman. In May 2015, he inaugurated the largest photovoltaic power station in Wallonia.

Other roles 

 Board member of Innovation Fund SA
 since 2018: Board member and executive director of Golden Lime PLC

Sources

External links
 www.carmeuse.com

Living people
Belgian businesspeople
Year of birth missing (living people)